Malegia letourneuxi is a species of leaf beetle of Egypt, described by Édouard Lefèvre in 1883. It was discovered in Shubra (a district of Cairo) by Aristide Letourneux.

References

Eumolpinae
Beetles of North Africa
Taxa named by Édouard Lefèvre
Beetles described in 1883